"Nothing to Lose" is a song written by Bret Michaels, and was recorded by Michaels as the lead single for his solo album, Custom Built. The song was originally recorded by Michaels himself, however, he was working with Miley Cyrus who asked to sing on the track with him. Miley Cyrus covered the hit Poison ballad "Every Rose Has Its Thorn" with Michaels for her album Can't Be Tamed and then became involved on Bret's new single. "Nothing to Lose" was the most added song to radio the week of its release, topping both Bon Jovi and Nickelback.

Background and composition
"Nothing to Lose" is a country rock ballad, backed mostly by acoustic guitar. The narrator describes a slow-churning declaration of codependence. "Nothing To Lose" features five recorded versions of the song; solo, solo acoustic, featuring Miley Cyrus, acoustic featuring Miley Cyrus and a country version also featuring the multi-platinum artist.

Reception
Blake Boldt of Engine 145 gave the song a "thumbs down" review. He said that Michaels lures in listeners with a suggestive passage about getting sexy to save a faded love. Boldt also went on to say that the song metal-lite, mixed with tween country. He also felt that Miley Cyrus stole the show with her harmonies.

Live performances
Bret Michaels performed 'Nothing to Lose' live with an acoustic guitar on "Lopez Tonight" and witnessing the audience's reaction to Michaels heartfelt performance, George Lopez closed with "That's how real rockers do it".

Charts

References

2010 singles
Bret Michaels songs
Miley Cyrus songs
Male–female vocal duets
Country ballads
Rock ballads
Songs written by Bret Michaels
2010 songs
2010s ballads
Country rock songs